The Stillman Exchange is a student newspaper of Seton Hall University in South Orange, New Jersey, United States. The paper, founded in 2006, focuses on business issues and is distributed bi-weekly, with issues being distributed on Tuesdays during the academic term.

In 2008, the paper launched an online version of its biweekly print edition, which offers all the articles found in the print edition along with several continuations.  (https://blogs.shu.edu/stillmanexchange/)

The Stillman Exchange is a 8-page, black & white periodical published on a bi-weekly basis from the Center for Securities Trading and Analysis in the W. Paul Stillman School of Business at Seton Hall University.

The mission of The Stillman Exchange is to educate Seton Hall students and its extended community on the impacts and interactions of current financial, domestic and international news events guided by the highest standards of integrity and professionalism. (Adopted Fall 2009)

History
The Stillman Exchange was founded with students from the W. Paul Stillman School of Business felt a need that students at Seton Hall were not getting enough business news exposure. The paper printed its first edition on March 29, 2006 and has been printing bi-weekly ever since.

In September 2008, under the direction of Gerardo Pecoraro and Magdalena Dewane, the newspaper added 3 new sections, International Business, Domestic News and Editorials.

In October 2009, after a year's worth of preparation, Managing Editor, Gerardo Pecoraro and exchange students from the University of Business and Economics (U.I.B.E.)in Beijing, China, published the nation's first college bilingual business newspaper. The Special Edition is distributed in the U.S. at Seton Hall University and in China at the U.I.B.E..

In September 2019, the paper added a new section called The SOMA Spotlight. The section covers local businesses in the South Orange-Maplewood area to strengthen ties between the university and the surrounding community, as well as promote local businesses.

Sections
The paper is divided into several sections

Money & Investing
Technology and Innovation
Stillman News
Trending
Sports Business
Domestic News
International News
International Business
Opinion
SOMA Spotlight

Bilingual Chinese/English Special Edition
On Wednesday, October 21, 2009, The Stillman Exchange released its first abridged four-page special edition written in both English and Chinese. The articles are written by exchange students enrolled in the "1+2" UIBE-SHU MBA program.

Staff
The staff are all undergraduate students enrolled at Seton Hall University.  The staff represents a full spectrum of business majors from the Stillman School of Business, as well as students from the School of Diplomacy, and the College of Arts & Sciences.

Contact
Website https://web.archive.org/web/20100724090645/http://www.stillmanexchange.com/

References

Seton Hall University
Student newspapers published in New Jersey